Jonathan Stoddard (October 9, 1807 – August 8, 1855) was an American attorney who served as the United States Attorney for the District of Connecticut under two presidents

Biography

Jonathan Stoddard was the oldest son of Dr. Abiram Stoddard and Eunice Clark Stoddard. He was born in Derby, Connecticut on October 9, 1807. After graduating his father's alma mater Yale in 1831 he began Yale Law School. Upon his graduation in 1833 he was admitted to the New Haven Bar. He was a Democrat and spent five years serving as the United States Attorney for the district of Connecticut. He died unmarried of an unknown illness in 1845.

References

19th-century American lawyers
1807 births
1855 deaths
Connecticut lawyers
People from New Haven, Connecticut
United States Attorneys for the District of Connecticut
Yale College alumni
Yale Law School alumni